Thormod Næs (12 April 1930 – 20 October 1997) was a Norwegian sport shooter. He was born in Vindafjord. He competed at the 1964 Summer Olympics in Tokyo.

References

1930 births
1997 deaths
People from Vindafjord
Norwegian male sport shooters
ISSF rifle shooters
Olympic shooters of Norway
Shooters at the 1964 Summer Olympics
Sportspeople from Rogaland
20th-century Norwegian people